Love Time may refer to:

Love Time (film), a 1934 American film
"Love Time" (song), a song by Badfinger on their 1974 album Wish You Were Here